The Battle of Reichenberg was a battle of the Third Silesian War (part of the Seven Years' War), fought on 21 April 1757 near the town of Reichenberg (Czech: Liberec) in Bohemia.

Background 
Marshal von Bevern had entered Bohemia with a corps of 15,000 Prussians. At Reichenberg he encountered Königsegg's Austrian corps. The full Austrian corps consisted of 18,000 infantry and 4,900 cavalry, but only about 14,000 of them had been concentrated at Reichenberg.

The experienced Bevern defeated his opponent. As a result, Bevern captured large quantities of Austrian supplies and could continue his march on Prague.

Order of Battle

Austrian Forces 
Austrian Forces during the battle were:

 Commander-in-Chief, Feldzeugmeister (General of Artillery) Christian Eusebius, Count von Königsegg-Rothenfels
 Vanguard (at the outskirts of the woods to the East of Reichenberg)
 Splényi Hussarregiment (2 Sqns)
 Karlstädter Grenz-Hussarregiment (1 Sqn)
 Main Corps
 Right Wing, under Major-General Count Franz Moritz von Lacy
 on the left bank of the Neisse in the entrenchments in-front of Reichenberg
 Starhemberg Infanterieregiment (1 Btn)
 Sprecher Infanterieregiment (1 Btn)
 behind the entrenchments between Rosenthal and Franzesdorf on the right bank of the Neisse
 Sincère Infanterieregiment (2 Btns)
 Gyulay Infanterieregiment (1 Btn)
 Forgách Infanterieregiment (1 Btn)
 Mercy-Argenteau Infanterieregiment (1 Btn)
 Warasdiner-Creutzer Grenzerbataillon
 2 Field artillery batteries
 Left Wing, under Christian Eusebius, Count von Königsegg-Rothenfels on the left bank of the Neisse
 Infantry (in the entrenchments)
 Converged Grenadiers (8 Coys)
 Converged Grenadiers (2 Coys)
 Mercy-Argenteau Infanterieregiment (1 Btn)
 Karlstädter-Szluiner Grenzerbataillon 
 1 Field artillery battery
 Cavalry, under Lieutenant-General the Count von Porporati deployed in two lines to the left of the entrenchments on the left bank
 Converged Carabiniers (2 Sqns)
 Pálffy Kürassierregiment (6 Sqns)
 Löwenstein Kürassierregiment (3 Sqns)
 Lichtenstein Dragonerregiment  (6 Sqns)
 Porporati Dragonerregiment (2 Sqns)
 Batthyányi Dragonerregiment (2 Sqns)
 Extreme left, occupying an isolated barricade in the woods
 Haller Infanterieregiment (2 Btns), occupying another barricade just behind the previous one
 Karlstädter-Szluiner Grenzerbataillon
 Sincère Infanterieregiment (2 Grenadier coys)
 Major-General Count von Würben's Brigade, arriving from Gabel (2 Btns making themselves ready in a clearing while the others were still on the march)
 Khuel Infanterieregiment (1 Btn)
 Leopold Pálffy Infanterieregiment (1 Btn)
 Another 10 Btns and 14 Grenadier coys were posted at Gabel under Field Marshal Maquire to defend the Passes of Lusatia

Prussian Forces 
Prussian Forces during the battle were (cavalry maintained 4 sqns and infantry had 2 battalions):

 Commander-in-Chief, August Wilhelm, Duke of Braunschweig-Wolfenbüttel-Bevern
 Infantry Commander, Lieutenant-General Hans Sigismund von Lestwitz
 Cavalry Commander, Major-General Frederick II Eugene, Duke of Württemberg
 Puttkamer Hussarregiment (vanguard)
 1 Battery of 12 x 12-pounder guns
 First Line
 Kahlden Grenadierbataillon
 Möllendorf Grenadierbataillon
 Billerbeck Greandierbataillon
 Prinz von Prußen Infanterieregiment
 Darmstadt Infanterieregiment
 Forcade Infanterieregiment
 Amstell Infanterieregiment
 Kleist Infanterieregiment
 Second Line
 Normann Dragonerregiment
 Katte Dragonerregiment
 Würtemburg Dragonerregiment
 Puttkamer Hussarregiment
 Prinz Heinrich Fusilierregiment

References

Sources 
 

Battle of Reichenberg
Battles of the Seven Years' War
Battles involving Prussia
Battles involving Austria
Battle
1757 in Austria
Battles in Bohemia
Battles of the Silesian Wars
History of the Liberec Region